Rue (Ruta graveolens) is a scented ornamental plant and culinary herb.

Rue may also refer to:

Botany
Ruta or the rue genus—whose species' common names oft include "rue"
Rutaceae or the rue family
Asplenium ruta-muraria or wall rue, a fern
Galega officinalis or goat's-rue, an edible legume
Peganum harmala, Syrian, African or wild rue
Tephrosia virginiana, also "goat's rue", a subshrub native to North America
 Thalictrum or the meadow-rues, in the buttercup family

Language
Rue, a dialect of the Sena language of Mozambique
 Rusyn language, spoken in central Europe (ISO 639: rue)

Music
 Rue (ballad), a traditional British and Irish ballad
 "Rue", a 2020 song by Girl in Red

People
Rue (surname), list of people so named
Rue McClanahan (1934–2010), American actress and comedian
Rue Protzer (born 1966), German jazz musician

Fictional characters
 Rue, from the The Hunger Games trilogy
Rue, a fox from the OneShot video game
 Rue,  from the Princess Tutu anime
 Rue Bennett, protagonist of the Euphoria teen drama series

Places
Rue, Somme, France
Canton of Rue
Rue, Switzerland
Rue, Virginia, United States

Other uses
 Rifts Ultimate Edition, a 1990 tabletop role-playing game
 Russian Union of Engineers

See also
A Rúa, Spanish municipality with demonym Rues
La Rue (disambiguation)
Rew (disambiguation)
Roo (disambiguation)
Roux, in cooking, a thickening agent
Ru (disambiguation)
Rue21, a clothing and accessories retailer